China Chengxin Credit Rating Group was founded in Beijing on 8 October 1992 through the incorporation of China Chengxin Credit Management Co Ltd (renamed as China Chengxin Credit Management Co. Ltd. in 2002), which is the first nationwide credit rating company of China. Subsequently, it formed subsidiaries and established branches across China, including China Chengxin International Credit Rating Company Limited (the joint venture credit rating company among China Chengxin Securities Rating Company Limited, Fitch Ratings  and International Finance Corporation established in 1999). The share-holder structure of the joint venture company was changed in 2006 when Moody's came in to take over the equity positions of Fitch and the supranational institution.
The company is one of the few major credit rating agencies currently operating in China.

China Chengxin Credit Management Co. Ltd. went to Hong Kong to set up its subsidiary, China Chengxin (Asia Pacific) Credit Ratings Company Limited, which received the Type Ten License from Hong Kong Securities and Futures Commission on 28 June 2012, thus became the first Chinese credit rating company going out of the Chinese mainland to do credit rating business in the international capital markets.

China Chengxin Credit Rating Group has branches and subsidiaries operating in Beijing, Shanghai, Hong Kong, Shenzhen, Fujian, Wuhan, Shandong, Liaoning, Tianjin, Jiangsu, Zhejiang, Shanxi and Shaanxi.

History 

1992–1999: Founding Period

In 1992, encouraged by the talks of the then Chinese leader Deng Xiaoping during his tour to the southern China, MAO Zhenhua, like many young people of China, started his private venture to form a credit rating company. Upon the approval given by People's Bank of China, MAO was successful in establishing the first Chinese credit rating company, China Chengxin Securities Credit Rating Company Limited under the Chinese corporation rules and regulations.

The company worked out the first set of credit rating system and methodology in China, which was assessed and accredited by the group of experts from the Finance and Economic Committee and Law Committee under the People's Congress, People's Bank of China, National Planning Commission, banks and securities house. 

1999–2005 Take-off Period

As the Chinese capital markets had just started growing, IFC, an agencies of World Bank Group, made efforts to help the Chinese capital markets to develop, including the establishment of an effective and efficient credit rating industry. After several years’ endeavour, this supranational institution succeeded in pulling together China Chengxin Securities Credit Rating Company, Fitch IBCA (now Fitch Ratings) and itself to form China's first credit rating joint venture company, China Chengxin International Credit Rating Company Limited in August 1999.  In July 2004, Fitch divested from the joint venture company to align with its global strategy of securing majority control over the overseas subsidiaries.

2006–2011 Advancing Period

The Chinese capital markets were further reformed in 2005, leading to the fast development of the debt market.  Moody's moved in to buy up to the regulatory cap of 49% share of China Chengxin International Credit Rating Company Limited from the local share-holders in September 2006. Moody's added additional management and technical support on rating methodologies and training of analysts to the joint venture company.

China Chengxin Securities Credit Rating Company Limited was renamed as China Chengxin Credit Management Company Limited to turn it into a holding company of all subsidiaries and branches formed or to be formed. Subsequently, China Chengxin Credit Rating Management Company Limited has subsidiaries and branches providing credit rating services in Beijing, Shanghai, Hong Kong, Shenzhen, Fujian, Wuhan, Shandong, Liaoning, Tianjin, Jiangsu, Zhejiang and Shanxi.

Owing to its first comer status and expertise acquired from the two international credit rating agencies, respectively. The China Chengxin Credit Rating Group can always capture the largest overall market share in the domestic market.

2012– Going out

Following the trend of internationalization of the Chinese currency, China Chengxin Credit Management Company Limited established its subsidiary in Hong Kong, China Chengxin (Asia Pacific) Credit Ratings Company Limited, which received the Type Ten License from Hong Kong Securities and Futures Commission on 28 June 2012, thus became the first Chinese credit rating company going out of the Chinese mainland to do credit rating business in the international capital markets.

China Chengxin (Asia Pacific) 

On 28 June 2012, China Chengxin (Asia Pacific) Credit Ratings Company Limited (“CCXAP”) was successful in applying for the type ten operating licence from Hong Kong Securities and Futures Commission, thus, became the first licensed Chinese credit rating agency to operate in the international credit rating market.

Regulatory approval and membership 

China Chengxin Credit Rating Groups' subsidies and branches obtained license from all the regulators in China such as People's Bank of China, China Insurance Regulatory Commission, National Development and Reform Commission and China Securities Regulatory Commission.

China
 1997 PBOC Nationally Recognized Bond Credit Rating Agency
 2003 CIRC Recognized Credit Rating Agency
 2003 NDRC Approved Credit Rating Agency
 2005 PBOC Recognized Credit Rating Agency in Interbank Market
 2007 CSRC Approved Credit Rating Agency
 Member of Securities Association of China
 Member of National Association of Financial Market Institutional Investors(NAFMII)
Hong Kong
 2012 SFC Type 10: Providing credit rating services

Sovereign Credit Rating 

China Chengxin Credit Rating Group through China Chengxin International Credit Rating Company Limited released its sovereign credit rating report for 30 countries in July 2012, as follows:.

References 

Credit rating agencies
Financial services companies of China
Companies based in Beijing